(stylized as uni-ball) and  are brands of pens and pencils, made by the  of Japan. The brand was introduced in 1979 as a rollerball pen model, then expanding to the rest of Mitsubishi Pencil products.

Mitsubishi Pencil Company distributes over 3,000 core products in over 100 countries through subsidiaries, such as Mitsubishi Pencil Company UK. Distribution in the United States, Canada and Mexico is by Uni-ball's North American Corporation in Wheaton, Illinois. In Germany they are sold by Faber-Castell, in the Persian Gulf and the Middle East by Hoshan Pan Gulf, in India by Linc Pen and Plastics Limited (LPPL), and in the Philippines by Lupel Corporation. Despite its naming and the nearly identical logomarks, Mitsubishi Pencil Company is unrelated to the Mitsubishi Group, and has never been a part of their keiretsu.  The logo itself is a family crest, or kamon.

History 

The "Mitsubishi Pencil Co., Ltd." company was founded in Tokyo by Niroku Masaki in 1887 as the "Masaki Pencil Manufacturing Company". After World War II, it was renamed "The Mitsubishi Pencil Company".

Masaki Pencil started to export its products, first to Mexico in 1927, then expanding to other markets including Belgium, Egypt, Portugal, Argentina, India and Netherlands. At the end of World War II, the company introduced the "9800" pencil. In 1959, Mitsubishi released its first ballpoint pen, while its first mechanical pencil was launched in 1961.

In 1966, they began creating performance pens and by 1979 they developed the first "Uniball" rollerball pen, which was the first ballpen with water-based ink and metallic tip. This pen would be a great success in Japan and North America. One year later, the company launched the "Paint", an oil-based marker.

While mainly focused on making pens, in 2008 they developed a new mechanical pencil that rotated the graphite lead every time it is lifted from the page to sharpen it into an even cone shape. This line of pencils is named as Kuru Toga.  The name Kuru Toga is a portmanteau of the two Japanese words 'kuru' (turning) and 'togaru' (to be sharpened).

In August 2020, Uni-ball announced a partnership with Starline.  Beginning in January 2021, Starline became the exclusive supplier of the Uni-ball brand for the promotional products industry.

Products 

Although Mitsubishi Pencil started as a wooden pencil manufacturer, the company is no longer specialized in that product, focusing on mechanical pencils instead. Uni-ball's writing implements brands include Jetstream (hybrid-ink ballpoint pens); Air, Eye (marketed as Vision in the U.S.A.) rollerball pens, Signo (pigment ink gel pens); Onyx, Kuru Toga  (mechanical pencils); Paint, Posca, Chalk, and Prockey (marker pens).

Wood-cased pencil brands include Hi-Uni, Uni and Mitsu-Bishi. 
Some other pen lines (mainly intended for the Japanese market) are Power Tank (pressurised ink cartridge), R:E (erasable ink pens), Laknock, Clifter (ballpoints), One (gel pens), Style Fit (multi-pen system), Shift, M-552 (mechanical pencils), and Propus (highlighters).

Uni-ball's range of products include:

References

External links 

 

Office supply companies of Japan
Manufacturing companies based in Tokyo
Manufacturing companies established in 1887
1887 establishments in Japan
Pen manufacturers
Japanese brands
Japanese stationery